Samuel W. Seeley House is located in Bridgeton, Cumberland County, New Jersey, United States. The house was built in 1799 and was added to the National Register of Historic Places on May 13, 1976.

See also
National Register of Historic Places listings in Cumberland County, New Jersey

References

Bridgeton, New Jersey
Federal architecture in New Jersey
Houses on the National Register of Historic Places in New Jersey
Houses completed in 1799
Houses in Cumberland County, New Jersey
National Register of Historic Places in Cumberland County, New Jersey
New Jersey Register of Historic Places